The Vatican Christmas Tree, also called the Saint Peter's Square Christmas Tree, is the decorated tree that is erected annually in the Saint Peter's Square directly in front of St. Peter's Basilica in the Vatican City to celebrate the Christmas holiday season.

The tradition of placing a Christmas tree as well as the life-size Nativity scene in Saint Peter's Square started in 1982 during the pontificate of Pope John Paul II, when the Polish-born Pope introduced the northern European symbol of Christmas spirit. The tradition of erecting a Christmas Tree was celebrated in northern Europe and in Poland, Pope John Paul II's country of origin, but not in the Vatican at the time.

The first tree came from Italy. Since then, the offering of the Christmas Tree to the Pope has become an honour, and each year the Vatican accepts a tree donated by a different European country or region.

The Christmas tree is installed in the centre of Saint Peter's Square, together with a life-size nativity scene that is unveiled on Christmas Eve. The nativity scene has seventeen life-size statues. Of these, nine are the original figures donated in 1842 by Saint Vincent Pallotti for the nativity scene in the Roman church of Sant'Andrea della Valle, and the other eight figures were added over the course of the years. In 2006 the Italian province of Trentino, and the local council of a village of Tesero, have provided a further thirteen sculpted wooden figures and animals, as well as household utensils for the depiction of daily life.

Trees

See also
Index of Vatican City-related articles
List of individual trees

References

Christmas traditions by country
Individual Christmas trees
Vatican City culture
Tourist attractions in Vatican City
Individual trees in Vatican City
Vatican